The 2012 Setanta Sports Cup Final was played on 12 May 2012, and was originally scheduled to be played at Windsor Park in Belfast. On 26 April, it was announced that the venue was to be changed to The Oval, also in Belfast. The cup was won by Crusaders on penalties.

Match details

See also
2012 Setanta Sports Cup

References

External links

2012
Setanta Sports Cup Final
Setanta Sports Cup Final 2012
Setanta Sports Cup Final 2012